Democratic security or Democratic security policy  refers to a Colombian security policy implemented during the administration of the Former President Álvaro Uribe (2002-2010). It was unveiled in June 2003.

Objectives
It has been stated that this policy seeks to achieve the following objectives, among others:   

Consolidate State control throughout Colombia to deny sanctuary to terrorists and perpetrators of violence.
Protect the population through the increase of State presence and a reduction in violence.
Destroy the illegal drug trade in Colombia to eliminate the revenues which finance terrorism and generate corruption and crime
Transparently and efficiently manage resources as a means to reform and improve the performance of government.

Several of these objectives stem from a belief in that the Colombian government should protect Colombian society from the effects of terrorism and the illegal drug trade, and in turn society as a whole should have a more active and comprehensive role in the government's struggle against illegal armed groups such as the FARC and ELN guerrillas or the paramilitary AUC, in order to ensure the defense and continued existence of the opportunity for both leftwing and rightwing political parties to engage in free and open debate, along with all the other aspects of democratic life.

Application
The previously mentioned objectives would be achieved through:
engaging the civilian population more actively
supporting soldiers
increasing intelligence capacity
reinstating control over national roads 
demobilizing illegal groups 
integrating the armed forces services 
increasing defense spending.

Controversy
The democratic security policy has become controversial inside and outside Colombia since the beginning of its application. Most of the critics and detractors of this policy, including human rights NGOs (such as Human Rights Watch and Amnesty International) and political opposition groups (such as the Colombian Liberal Party and the Independent Democratic Pole), share the assessment that it focuses too much on the military aspects of the Colombian Armed Conflict, relegating complex social, human rights and economic concerns to a secondary role, superseded by the perceived need for increased security. 

Several critical analysts have accepted that there have been some factual improvements in the areas of security (for the most part) and human rights (to a lesser degree), but they also question the exact validity and application of some of the statements, pointing out serious problems, in particular (but not only) paramilitary related, which remain a source of grave concern.   It is argued that any limited short-term results achieved in this manner would not be sufficient to effectively resolve the country's prolonged state of violence, and in fact may actually worsen the situation by alienating or intimidating part of the population, directly or indirectly. 

Several of the critics also argue that, due to the increased degree of involvement of the civilian population, that this policy overexposes civilians to the dangers of the conflict, becoming potential targets for any abuses committed both by the illegal armed groups and the government's security forces. From this point of view, the resulting polarization caused by the long-term application of the policy would also be considered an obstacle to the achievement of a negotiated solution of the conflict with FARC and ELN guerrillas.

A number of the more radical critics, in particular leftwingers and sympathizers or members of FARC, also consider that "democratic security" may be a euphemism for the controversial national security policy that existed throughout South America during the later stages of the Cold War, seeking to stop the spread of Communism. This would imply that the application this policy would also lead to the repression of any form of dissent and opposition to the current administration, including student movements and political parties. Supporters of the policy (and most other critics) tend to not consider the previous argument to be accurate, arguing that there are several differences between both policies, in particular that the democratic security policy is being implemented by a legally elected government, in an environment where a number of democratic and political liberties are guaranteed, despite the continuing conflict.

References

External links
Colombia - Democratic Security & Defense Policy
Política de Seguridad Democrática (in Spanish, .PDF)
 Amnesty International - Colombia : The "democratic security" policy is not a human rights policy
BBC Talking Point- Uribe defends security policies 
The International Crisis Group - Colombia: President Uribe’s Democratic Security Policy (.PDF)
UN High Commissioner for Human Rights - Colombia 2005 Report  (Spanish and English)
Alternet - Human Rights Crumble in Colombia
The Miami Herald - Colombia - Democratic Security program not a failure
HACER - Colombia's security policy: You do the math

Presidency of Álvaro Uribe
Democracy
Law enforcement in Colombia
Politics of Colombia